The Albanian identity card (Letërnjoftim) is a national identity card issued by Albanian authorities to Albanian citizens. It is proof of identity, citizenship and residence. The current version is in ID1 format and biometric. The ID card is compulsory for citizens over 16 years of age, costs 1,500 lekë (about €10) and is valid for 10 years.

History
Albania issued identity cards to citizens until 1991, the year the political system changed. For 18 years, in the absence of such a document, people were obliged to provide birth certificates with photos, which was considered inconvenient.

In 2007, with assistance from the Organization for Security and Co-operation in Europe, a central population database was created. After that, Albanian authorities called an international tender for the production of identity cards. The tender was won by the French company Sagem Sécurité (Morpho, Safran Group). Albania commenced issuing identity cards on 12 January 2009.

Appearance
The Albanian ID card is a plastic credit card size card. The front contains the bearer's photo and the following fields, written in Albanian and English: 
 Nationality: Shqiptare/Albanian
 Document number
 Full name, including surname and all given names
 Photograph (both printed and processed to watermark)
 Date of birth
 Place of birth
 Sex
 Personal number
 Authority
 Date of issue
 Date of expiry (normally 10 years after the date of issue)
 Signature
On the photo a micro-holographic reflecting stamp is placed. The back contains the machine readable zone. 
The microchip,  visible on the back contains biometric data such as fingerprints of the holder, the image, signature, etc. The data can be extracted from the chip with wireless RFID technology. The ID card serves as a travel document for international travel between a limited number of countries.

Issuing procedure
An Albanian identity card is requested at the local municipality (after paying the required fee; presently 1,500 lek or about €10 at the post office) where a digital picture of the bearer's face and fingerprints are taken. The card can be picked up in person after about 15 days, when the bearer identifies themselves with their fingerprints.

Countries
An Albanian ID Card is accepted as a travel document by the following countries:

Electronic Services
Safran Aleat under the concessionary contract offers eALEAT Services, which are the new Identity Services, on behalf of the Ministry of Internal Affairs (MIA), through a secure platform that provides identity trust to any electronic transaction, for which Aleat is certified by NAEC.
eALEAT Services through the National ID Card offers to all Albanian Citizens the following three Services: Authentication, Authentication and DATA, and Electronic Signing.

See also

 Albanian passport
 Driving licence in Albania
 Border crossings of Albania

External links
 Aleat Official Website
 Modernization project helps improve public services in Albania, OSCE
 Albania's ID cards key to visa regime, elections

References

Albania
Identity documents of Albania